is a Japanese football player.

Club statistics
Updated to 23 February 2018.

References

External links

 Profile at Kataller Toyama

1991 births
Living people
Kanazawa Seiryo University alumni
Association football people from Hokkaido
Japanese footballers
J2 League players
J3 League players
Kataller Toyama players
Association football defenders
People from Asahikawa